State Route 13 is a north–south state highway in the northern and southeastern portion of the U.S. state of Ohio. It is the tenth longest state route in Ohio . Its southern terminus is at State Route 550 near Athens, and its northern terminus is at U.S. Route 6 in Huron.

Route description
Route 13 arises in Dover Township, Athens County, Ohio at Ohio State Route 550 at its junction with US Route 33. It travels west to the heart of Chauncey, Ohio, then turns north at its junction with Ohio State Route 682. After leaving Chauncey, it bypasses Millfield, Ohio, then enters Trimble Township and passes through Redtown, Jacksonville, Trimble, Glouster, Palos, then passes by the dam side of Burr Oak State Park and passes Burr Oak. It then enters Perry County and continues north.  For much of its length in Athens and Perry Counties, the highway is paralleled by a line of the Norfolk Southern Railway.

History
The southern terminus of Ohio State Route 13 was originally in the village of Chauncey, Ohio, at the intersection with Ohio State Route 682 that is now at mile 3.15.  This original terminus was at what was then US-33.  Since then, US-33 was rebuilt as a four-lane divided highway, and is across the Hocking River now from Chauncey.  The former section of US-33 was divided between Ohio State Route 682, to the west, and Ohio State Route 13, to the east, slightly extending both roadways.

North of Chauncey, the highway now is almost straight as it passes Millfield, Ohio and goes to Redtown, Ohio, and passes through a cut through a ridge.  Originally, the highway looped through Millfield and Truetown.

Major intersections

References

013
Transportation in Athens County, Ohio
Transportation in Perry County, Ohio
Transportation in Licking County, Ohio
Transportation in Knox County, Ohio
Transportation in Richland County, Ohio
Transportation in Huron County, Ohio
Transportation in Erie County, Ohio